|}

The Grand Sefton Handicap Chase is a National Hunt steeplechase in Great Britain which is open to horses aged six years or older. It is run at Aintree over a distance of about 2 miles and 5 furlongs (2 miles 5 furlongs and 19 yards, or 4,242 metres), and during its running there are eighteen fences to be jumped. The race is scheduled to take place in November. 

It was first run over a one hundred year period from 1865 to 1965 as part of Aintree's autumn meeting and was run over a distance of just under three miles. Originally, the Grand Sefton was one of the most important events of the autumn, but after the Second World War its popularity waned as Aintree's fortunes foundered. In 2003, the race was revived and run on the first day of the November Becher Meeting and run over the same fences as Aintree's most famous race, the Grand National. Prior to 2021 the race was run at Aintree's meeting on the first Saturday in December.

Winners since 2003

See also
 Horse racing in Great Britain
 List of British National Hunt races

References
Racing Post:

Sport in the Metropolitan Borough of Sefton
Aintree Racecourse
National Hunt chases
National Hunt races in Great Britain
Recurring sporting events established in 1865
1865 establishments in England